The FSLK200 (Fernspählehrkompanie 200) was a highly specialized reconnaissance unit of the German Armed Forces (Bundeswehr). It has also been described as a deep reconnaissance company.

Fernspäher is an old term for elite reconnaissance troopers, relating to the word fern (long range, distance) and the word Späher (scout). Thus, the Fernspäher are specially trained and equipped reconnaissance soldiers who cover great distances to gather intelligence and fulfill military tasks of high importance.

In October 2011 the Federal Ministry of Defence (Bundesministerium der Verteidigung) announced that the FSLK200 would be deactivated, and their functions integrated into the reconnaissance units of the EGB Forces of the Rapid Forces Division, a process that was to be completed by the year 2014.

Task
The FSLK200 was tasked with the gathering of critical intelligence deep behind enemy lines, whereby primarily, important strategic targets were to be recced, to enable or support a joint strike measure.

Hereby, the company was to adopt a supporting role for other Special Forces branches of the German Armed Forces. Soldiers in service with the FSLK200 were qualified, to conduct special operations stationary or mobile, at both night and in daytime, and to provide extended documentation and analysis of gathered intelligence through the means of optronic reconnaissance.

The syllable -lehr within Fernspäh-lehr-kompanie 200 designated yet another very special task of this company. It was the training, evaluation and demonstrations unit (Lehrtruppenteil) within the FSLK200. As such, it supervised and conducted special forces training for other specialised branches within the German Armed Forces. Secondly, in peace time, it was tasked with the field evaluation and demonstration of new tactics and equipment. The clearly offensive role of this unit, regained and attracted further interest again, only shortly after September 11, 2001 and during the emerging Global War on Terrorism (GWOT).

History
Until the activation of the German Army's Kommando Spezialkräfte (Special Forces Command) in late 1996, the land arm of the Bundeswehr had three Fernspäher Companies (100, 200 and 300) with one being assigned to each Corps. The first unit of this kind was trained and commanded by Major Konrad Rittmeyer. Former German armies did not know the concept of long range reconnaissance. Rittmeyer studied the Finnish Army's World War II long-range patrol teams that conducted reconnaissance, sabotage, and prisoner capture missions as far as 300 km deep into Soviet territory, surviving for days on carried supplies or weeks on parachute dropped resupplies; furthermore he drew on the special skills of German Gebirgsjäger (mountain infantry), Fallschirmjäger (parachute infantry), and the special forces of Germany's NATO allies.

Rittmeyer's initial Fernspäh company, back in the day simply designated as Lehrgruppe R (Training Group R), quickly reflagged as Fernspählehrkompanie 200. His concept proved prolific enough to allow the creation of a Fernspäher school in Weingarten, South Germany. This institution would eventually reflag as the International Long Range Reconnaissance Patrol School (ILRRPS) and later move to Pfullendorf. From May 2001 it was called the International Special Training Center (ISTC). ILRRPS provided training for comparable units from Belgium, Denmark, Greece, Italy, Netherlands, Norway, Turkey, and the United States. Initially the British Special Air Service provided the Commanding Officer and some instructors for ILRRPS however they later withdrew from participation. When the Special Forces Command was activated in 1996, many of the ranks were filled with personnel from Fernspähkompanie 100 and Fernspähkompanie 300 which disbanded at last.

Chain of command
The FSLK200 had answered directly to the Special Operations Division (Division Spezielle Operationen) of the German Armed Forces and was later a part of the newly activated branch of army reconnaissance troops (Heeresaufklärungstruppe). Prior to the year 2007, the long range reconnaissance branch of service (Fernspähtruppe) was an independently acting formation within the German Armed Forces. Their crest and beret insignia displayed an eagle, as the most common symbol of all airborne qualified troops, with a set of lightning bolts in its claws, diving out of the sky, in front of a pair of crossed lances, which are the traditional insignia of German cavalry forces.

Structure
The FSLK 200 consists of four SR platoons, an additional special applications SR platoon (covering the technical aspects of intelligence gathering as well as analysis of gathered data), a special applications maintenance group, a special applications support group, two specialized medical squads and a specialized military intelligence platoon. The overall-strength amounts to more than 220 troops.
 Fernspählehrkompanie 200
 Kompanieführung (Company headquarters)
 1. Fernspähzug (1st SR platoon)
 2. Fernspähzug (2nd SR platoon)
 3. Fernspähzug (3rd SR platoon)
 4. Fernspähzug (4th SR platoon)
 Fernspähspezialzug (Special applications SR platoon)
 Feldnachrichtenzug (Military intelligence platoon)
 Versorgungsgruppe Fernspäh (Special applications support group)
 Instandsetzungsgruppe Fernspäh (Special applications maintenance group)
 2× Sanitätstrupp Fernspäh (Specialized medical squad)

In October 2011 the German ministry of defence announced that FSLK 200 will be deactivated and its elements integrated into the KSK by 2014.

Missions
As with all branches of the German Armed Forces, FSLK200 had needed the approval of the German Bundestag, in order to officially participate in foreign deployments. This permission can however be obtained subsequently, if the situation would have required immediate action. Details concerning the former or present activity and operations of the FSLK200 are widely undisclosed. Today, it is known that members of the FSLK200 (Fernspäher) carried out missions in Bosnia and Herzegovina, during the Yugoslav Wars, and later during Operation Enduring Freedom in Afghanistan. Additionally, members of the FSLK200 (Fernspäher) were shipped to the Democratic Republic of the Congo in the year 2006, as being part of the EUFOR RD Congo deployment.

Weaponry
The sophisticated arsenal of the FSLK200 was mainly based upon standard issue weaponry and small arms available to the German Armed Forces (Bundeswehr), yet with special additions that were not readily available to regular forces. The standard infantry weapons, with no exception for the FSLK200, were either the Heckler & Koch G36 (G36K/AG36) assault rifle, or the Heckler & Koch G3 battle rifle, followed by the Heckler & Koch MP5 submachine gun in several variants. Heavy weapons have included the Heckler & Koch HK21 (G8/G8A1) general purpose machine gun, the Rheinmetall MG3 general purpose machine gun, and the AWM (G22) and AW50 (G24) sniper rifles produced by Accuracy International. Sidearms have included the Heckler & Koch P12 and Heckler & Koch P8 universal self-loading pistols.

References

External links
 Official Website of FSLK200 via the Wayback Machine

Cold War military history of Germany
Military units and formations established in 1962
Military units and formations disestablished in 2014
Special forces of Germany
Units and formations of the German Army (1956–present)
Army reconnaissance units and formations
Special forces of West Germany